Jonathan (hatched ) is a Seychelles giant tortoise (Aldabrachelys gigantea hololissa), a subspecies of the Aldabra giant tortoise (Aldabrachelys gigantea); he is the oldest known living land animal. Jonathan resides on the island of Saint Helena, a British Overseas Territory in the South Atlantic Ocean.

History 
Jonathan, hatched , was brought to Saint Helena from the Seychelles in the Indian Ocean in 1882, along with three other tortoises at about 50 years of age. He was named in the 1930s by Governor of Saint Helena Sir Spencer Davis and has lived through 31 governors' terms. He continues to live on the grounds of Plantation House, the official residence of the governor; he is cared for by the government of Saint Helena.

Age 

His age is estimated because he was "fully mature" when brought to Saint Helena in 1882. "Fully mature" means at least 50 years old, giving him a hatching date no later than 1832. A photograph featuring Jonathan originally thought to date from 1902 actually dates from 1886, showing Jonathan four years after his arrival on Saint Helena. Measurements taken from the photograph show that he was definitely fully mature in 1886.

In 2022, Jonathan's estimated age exceeded that of the tortoise that Guinness World Records had recognised as the oldest recorded ever, Tu'i Malila, who died in Tonga in 1966 at the age of 189. Adwaita, an Aldabra giant tortoise that died in 2006 in the Alipore Zoological Gardens of Kolkata, India, is believed to have lived to the age of 255 years, but this has not been confirmed.

In media 
In February 2014, as part of the Queen's Baton Relay ahead of the 2014 Commonwealth Games, the baton visited Saint Helena and Governor Mark Capes, whilst holding the baton, posed for a photo alongside Jonathan in the grounds of Plantation House.

BBC Radio featured Jonathan in an episode of From Our Own Correspondent in March 2014 after ocean rower Sally Kettle visited Saint Helena.

The Saint Helena five-pence coin has Jonathan on its reverse.

Since 2015 
As of December 2015, Jonathan was reported to be "alive and well [...] He's blind from cataracts, has lost his sense of smell, and so cannot detect food (his fellow giants mug me and can detect the tiniest morsel dropped on the ground), but he has retained excellent hearing." In January 2016, the BBC reported that Jonathan was given a new diet intended to keep him healthy and extend his life. Due to his old age, Jonathan spends his days doing almost everything with his mate, including eating, sleeping and mating.

The sex of Frederica, one of two of his favourite tortoises thought to be female (the other being Emily), as well as his companion since 1991, was cast into doubt in 2017 when island veterinarian Catherine Man indicated that due to a deformity of its plastron its sex could not be verified. While Frederica was undergoing the examination, Jonathan came over and did not leave the side of Frederica and the veterinarian during the entire process.

To mark Jonathan's supposed 190th birthday in February 2022, island officials planned to make a series of commemorative stamps and visitors received a certificate featuring a photograph of his first known footprint. 

On December 4, 2022, Jonathan the tortoise turned 190 years old. Local residents arranged three days of Jonathan's birthday celebration, presenting a cake made entirely from his favorite healthy foods.

See also 
Harriet (tortoise)
List of longest-living organisms

References

External links

Aldabrachelys
1830s animal births
Individual tortoises
Animal mascots
Saint Helena
Oldest animals